FIFC can refer to one of the following English football clubs:

 Folkestone Invicta F.C.
 Fulbourn Institute F.C.
 Fish Island F.C.